Kazimirovka is a rural locality (a khutor) in Zhuravskoye Rural Settlement, Kantemirovsky  District, Voronezh Oblast, Russia. The population was 160 as of 2010.

Geography
Kazimirovka is located 8 km northwest of Kantemirovka (the district's administrative centre) by road. Kasyanovka is the nearest rural locality.

References 

Rural localities in Kantemirovsky District